Ali Wallace (fl. 1840-1907) was the name used for a Malay from Sarawak, who accompanied and assisted Alfred Russel Wallace in his travels and explorations from 1855 to 1862. Initially recruited as a cook for his expedition, Ali was later responsible for independently collecting many significant specimens that are credited to Wallace. He also made observations of the birds and the people which were communicated to Wallace. It has been estimated that Ali collected and prepared nearly 5,150 bird specimens. Many of his specimens survive in collections of natural history museums.

Travels with Wallace
Alfred Russel Wallace travelled to the Malay archipelago in March 1854 along with his collecting assistant Charles Martin Allen (1839–92). During his travels he hired as many as 1200 people at various points of time and in various places. Among them some made an impression on him and were credited in his writings. When they arrived in Singapore on 18 April 1854, Wallace hired a Malay boy named Ali. He described him:

Ali later became an expert at shooting and skinning birds. He accompanied Wallace and Allen and became one his most trusted servants. On Aru, it was  probably Ali who collected the specimens of the king bird-of-paradise (Cicinnurus regius). He also collected an ivory-breasted pitta (described as Pitta gigas) from Halmahera. Ali accompanied Wallace to New Guinea in 1858 before returning to Ternate. It was on Batchian on 24 August 1858 that Ali went to collect birds while Wallace collected insects. Wallace wrote:

 
The species was named by George Robert Gray as Semioptera wallacii or Wallace's standardwing.

While at Ternate, Ali married a woman and he did not join Wallace in 1859. Ali joined Wallace again in 1861 on a trip to the island of Bouru. In 1862 Wallace went to Singapore where he began preparations to return home to England. Here he provided Ali with money, guns, ammunition and various supplies. Wallace had him photographed and in his 1905 book notes:

Life after Wallace
In 1907 American herpetologist Thomas Barbour was in Ternate and he noted in his 1943 memoir:

A 2015 analysis by John van Wyhe and Gerrell M. Drawhorn noted that Ali was more than just a working assistant but that he truly immersed himself into the study of birds. Searching for Ali Wallace, a documentary film, was produced in 2016.

References

External links 
 Talk by John van Wyhe
 van Wyhe, John (16 October 2017). "'I am Ali Wallace', the Malay assistant of Alfred Russel Wallace: an excerpt". The Conversation.
 "Searching for Ali Wallace: A Film". The Alfred Russel Wallace Website. 
Malaysian ornithologists
Naturalists
1907 deaths
People from Sarawak
Malaysian people of Malay descent
Zoological collectors